Påarps GIF is a former Swedish football club located in Påarp in Helsingborg Municipality, Skåne County.

Background
Påarps Gymnastik-och Idrottsförening were founded on 20 February 1931. The founders of the club were John Dahl, Thure Persson, Axel Lindh, Hjalmar Cronkvist and William Lund. On 19 August 1932 a football field was opened at Haga, next to the Flybjärs funfair. Activities at the time included football, gymnastics, table tennis, ladies handball and skiing.  Today the club concentrates on football and bandy. PGIF's facilities include Medevi playing field (opened in 1949), a clubhouse, kitchen, office, dressing rooms and storage areas.

The most famous player to emerge from the club's youth ranks is Andreas Granqvist who has played for Helsingborgs IF, Wigan Athletic and currently FC Groningen in the Netherlands. It is also the boyhood club of Jonas Dahlgren, who would go on to play in Allsvenskan for Halmstads BK, Helsingborgs IF, and Trelleborgs FF.

Since their foundation Påarps GIF has participated mainly in the middle and lower divisions of the Swedish football league system.  The club currently
plays in Division 3 Sydvästra Götaland which is the fifth tier of Swedish football. They play their home matches at the Medevi IP in Påarp.

Påarps GIF are affiliated to Riksidrottsförbundet, Svenska Fotbollförbundet and Skånes Fotbollförbund.

Recent history
In recent seasons Påarps GIF have competed in the following divisions:

2011 – Division III, Sydvästra Götaland
2010 – Division III, Sydvästra Götaland
2009 – Division III, Sydvästra Götaland
2008 – Division IV, Skåne Norra
2007 – Division III, Sydvästra Götaland
2006 – Division II, Södra Götaland
2005 – Division III, Sydvästra Götaland
2004 – Division III, Södra Götaland
2003 – Division III, Södra Götaland
2002 – Division IV, Skåne Västra
2001 – Division IV, Skåne Nordvästra
2000 – Division V, Skåne Västra
1999 – Division V, Skåne Nordvästra

Attendances

In recent seasons Påarps GIF have had the following average attendances:

Footnotes

External links
 Påarps GIF – Official website
 Påarps GIF on Facebook

Football clubs in Skåne County
Association football clubs established in 1931
1931 establishments in Sweden